The Khyber Pakhtunkhwa women's cricket team is the women's representative cricket team for the Pakistani province of Khyber Pakhtunkhwa. They competed in the Women's Cricket Challenge Trophy in 2011–12 and 2012–13.

History
Khyber Pakhtunkhwa competed in the Twenty20 Women's Cricket Challenge Trophy in its first two seasons, in 2011–12 and 2012–13. They finished bottom of their group in both seasons, losing all four matches they played.

Players

Notable players
Players who played for Khyber Pakhtunkhwa and played internationally are listed below, in order of first international appearance (given in brackets):

 Sabahat Rasheed (2005)
 Sukhan Faiz (2009)
 Omaima Sohail (2018)

Seasons

Women's Cricket Challenge Trophy

See also
 Khyber Pakhtunkhwa cricket team

References

Women's cricket teams in Pakistan
Cricket in Khyber Pakhtunkhwa